Saint-Venant's principle, named after Adhémar Jean Claude Barré de Saint-Venant, a French elasticity theorist,  may be expressed as follows:

The original statement was published in French by Saint-Venant in 1855. Although this informal statement of the principle is well known among structural and mechanical engineers, more recent mathematical literature gives a rigorous interpretation in the context of partial differential equations. An early such interpretation was made by Richard von Mises in 1945.

The Saint-Venant's principle allows elasticians to replace complicated stress distributions or weak boundary conditions with ones that are easier to solve, as long as that boundary is geometrically short. Therefore, the Saint-Venant's principle can be regarded as a statement on the asymptotic behavior of the Green's function by a point-load.

See also
Shallow water equations

References 

Elasticity (physics)
Principles